Alain Barrau (17 February 1947 – 24 July 2021) was a French politician. He was a member of the Socialist Party (PS).

Biography

Professional career
Barrau served as student council president at Sciences Po during the May 68 events. He graduated in 1969 and became an assistant at Panthéon-Sorbonne University. He subsequently became director of teaching at the Centre national d'information pour le progrès économique. He held several administrative positions linked to the European Parliament, and was appointed its Director of the Information Office for France in 2008.

Political career
Barrau was elected to the National Assembly in 1986 in a system of party-list proportional representation. in 1988, the system changed to a regional vote, and he began to represent Hérault's 6th constituency. Although he was defeated by Raymond Couderc in 1993, he was victorious in 1997. In his final term in office, he served on various committees, such as the Cultural, Family and Social Affairs Committee, the Foreign Affairs Committee, and the Finance Committee. He served as President of the National Assembly delegation to European communities from 1999 to 2002.

Barrau was also Mayor of Béziers from 1989 to 1995 and was General Councilor of the Canton of Béziers-2 from 1988 to 1989.

Other activities
From 1974 to 1986, Barrau was President of the Comité national des associations de jeunesse et d’éducation populaire and was a member of the Conseil national de la vie associative et du Conseil économique et social.

Death
Alain Barrau died in Paris on 24 July 2021 at the age of 74 following a battle with cerebrovascular disease.

Decorations
Knight of the Legion of Honour (2017)

References

1947 births
2021 deaths
Politicians from Paris
Members of the National Assembly (France)
Mayors of places in Occitania (administrative region)
Socialist Party (France) politicians
Deaths from cerebrovascular disease
20th-century French politicians
21st-century French politicians
French general councillors
Sciences Po alumni
Academic staff of Pantheon-Sorbonne University
Chevaliers of the Légion d'honneur